Alix Duchet (born 30 December 1997) is a French basketball player for Tango Bourges Basket and the French national team.

She participated at the 2018 FIBA Women's Basketball World Cup. and EuroBasket Women 2021.

References

External links

1997 births
Living people
Basketball players at the 2020 Summer Olympics
French women's basketball players
Medalists at the 2020 Summer Olympics
Olympic basketball players of France
Olympic bronze medalists for France
Olympic medalists in basketball
Point guards
Sportspeople from Roanne